Tweak7 (previously TweakVista) is a software tool for Windows Vista and Windows 7 that allows modification of various OS-specific functions, most notably the settings surrounding the Desktop Window Manager, User Account Control and startup programs. A beta version became available in July 2005, with a complete overhaul in June 2007. A Windows 7 version was released in October 2009.

The program offers changes on two levels - a first level for non-technical users with descriptions in "plain language", and a second level for power users. It was recommended by Personal Computer World as "a very useful tool that doesn’t require advanced knowledge."

Tweak7 is developed by Stardock and distributed as part of their Object Desktop suite. It is co-distributed by Advanced PC Media.

References

External links 
 Tweak7 home page

Utilities for Windows
Windows-only software
Stardock software